José António Inácio (born 5 February 1967) is an Angolan judoka. He competed in the men's middleweight event at the 1988 Summer Olympics.

References

External links
 

1967 births
Living people
Angolan male judoka
Olympic judoka of Angola
Judoka at the 1988 Summer Olympics
Place of birth missing (living people)